E. Don Ault is a former American football coach. He served as the head football coach at Bethany College in Bethany, West Virginia from 1973 to 1981 and Slippery Rock University of Pennsylvania from 1982 to 1986, compiling a career college football coaching record of 70–58–2.

In recognition of his outstanding coaching record and integrity the football field at Bethany College was named in his honor in 2021.

Head coaching record

College

References

Year of birth missing (living people)
Living people
Bethany Bison football coaches
Marshall Thundering Herd football coaches
Slippery Rock football coaches
West Liberty Hilltoppers football players
High school football coaches in Ohio